Velagić is a surname. Notable people with the surname include:

Admir Velagić (born 1975), Bosnia and Herzegovina footballer
Almir Velagić (born 1981), Bosnian-German weightlifter
Azur Velagić (born 1991), Bosnian footballer
Đula Velagić (born 2001), Bosnian footballer

See also
 , a historical site of the Velagić family near Blagaj, Bosnia and Herzegovina

Bosnian surnames